Anthology is a greatest hits collection by the British hard rock band UFO, released in 1986. It was published by Castle Communications, under licence from Chrysalis Records, the band's original label.

Track listing
"Rock Bottom" – 6:27 (from the album Phenomenon)
"Built for Comfort" – 3:00 (from the album Phenomenon)
"Highway Lady" – 3:46 (from the album No Heavy Petting)
"Can You Roll Her" – 2:56 (from the album No Heavy Petting)
"A Fool for Love" – 3:52 (from the album ''Making Contact’’)
"Shoot Shoot" – 3:57 (from the album Force It)
"Too Hot to Handle" – 3:35 (from the album Lights Out)
"Gettin' Ready" – 3:43 (from the album Lights Out)
"Only You Can Rock Me" – 4:08 (from the album Obsession)
"Looking Out for No. 1" – 4:32 (from the album Obsession)
"Something Else" – 3:18 (from the album Mechanix)
"Doing It All for You" – 4:55 (from the album Mechanix)
"When It's Time to Rock" – 5:20 (from the album Making Contact (album)|Making Contact)
"Diesel in the Dust" – 4:25 (from the album Making Contact)

References

1986 compilation albums
UFO (band) compilation albums